Dinic may refer to:

Dinić, a surname
Dinič, a surname
DiNic, a surname
Dinic's algorithm